Gheorghe Apostoleanu (1832-1895) was a Romanian politician and jurist who served as the acting Minister of Justice from March 30, 1860 until April 30, 1860.

References 

Romanian Ministers of Justice
People from Focșani
1832 births
1895 deaths